Mark Johnson is an American politician who is currently the Ohio state representative in Ohio's 92nd district. He won the seat after incumbent Republican Bill Reineke became termlimited after completing his fourth term in 2020. He defeated Democrat Beth Workman in 2020, winning 67.0% to 33.0%. He was to face Republican Caleb Johnson in a primary election, but Caleb Johnson dropped out of the race prior to the scheduled primary election.

References

Living people
Republican Party members of the Ohio House of Representatives
21st-century American politicians
Year of birth missing (living people)